This is a list of years in Taiwan.

Taiwan under Republic of China rule (from 1945)

Taiwan under Japanese rule (1895–1945)

Taiwan under Qing rule (1683–1895)

Kingdom of Tungning (1662–1683)

Dutch Formosa (1624–1662) and Spanish Formosa (1626–1642)

Prehistory of Taiwan (before 1624)

Early 17th century

16th century

See also
History of Taiwan
Timeline of Taiwanese history

 
China-related lists
History of Taiwan
Year